Eros is a genus of net-winged beetles in the  family Lycidae. There are at least three described species in Eros.

Species
These three species belong to the genus Eros:
 Eros humeralis (Fabricius, 1801)
 Eros nigripes Schaeffer
 Eros ogumae Matsumura, 1911

References

Further reading

 

Lycidae
Articles created by Qbugbot